The 2013 BWF World Championships was a badminton tournament which was held from 5 to 11 August 2013 at the Tianhe Sports Center in Guangzhou, China.

Host city selection
Copenhagen, Guangzhou, and Macau submitted bids for this edition of championships. On 9 December 2011, Badminton World Federation decided to award the championships to Guangzhou during a meeting in Queenstown, New Zealand.

Draw
The draw was held on 22 July at Guangzhou, China.

Schedule
All five events started on the first day and concluded with the final on the last day.

All times are local (UTC+8).

Medalists

Medal table

Participating countries
345 players from 49 countries participated at this year's edition. The number in parentheses indicate the player contributed by each country.

 (2)
 (2)
 (1)
 (5)
 (4)
 (3)
 (26)
 (17)
 (2)
 (1)
 (5)
 (17)
 (2)
 (12)
 (1)
 (2)
 (5)
 (14)
 (13)
 (14)
 (28)
 (3)
 (1)
 (19)
 (18)
 (1)
 (25)
 (1)
 (3)
 (6)
 (8)
 (2)
 (4)
 (6)
 (14)
 (6)
 (6)
 (1)
 (2)
 (3)
 (1)
 (3)
 (3)
 (14)
 (8)
 (1)
 (7)
 (1)
 (2)

References

External links
tournamentsoftware.com

 
2013
World Championships
BWF World Championships
2013 BWF World Championships
Bwf World Championships
Badminton tournaments in China